Aleksandr Viktorovich Suchkov (born 29 February 1980) is a Russian former professional footballer.

Club career
He made his debut in the Russian Premier League in 1999 for PFC CSKA Moscow.

Honours
 Russian Premier League bronze: 1999.
 Russian Cup finalist: 2000.

References

Russian footballers
Russian Premier League players
Russian expatriate footballers
Expatriate footballers in Kazakhstan
PFC CSKA Moscow players
FC Khimki players
FC Zhenis Astana players
1980 births
Living people
Russian expatriate sportspeople in Kazakhstan
FC Aktobe players
Association football forwards